Moores Lake is a lake located in Kent County, Delaware, United States.

References

Bodies of water in Kent County, Delaware
Lakes of Delaware